Homer Airport  is a state-owned public-use airport located two nautical miles (4 km) east of the central business district of Homer, a town in the Kenai Peninsula Borough of the U.S. state of Alaska.

Facilities and aircraft

It has one runway designated 3/21 with a 6,701 x 150 ft (2,042 x 46 m) asphalt pavement, and a facility for floatplanes on nearby Beluga Lake.

For the 12-month period ending January 1, 2006, the airport had 49,821 aircraft operations, an average of 136 per day: 46% scheduled commercial, 32% air taxi, 22% general aviation and <1% military. At that time there were 93 aircraft based at this airport: 90% single-engine, 4% multi-engine, 3% helicopter and 2% ultralight.

The FAA completed a new master plan for the airport in 2006, and expansion and safety improvements are ongoing. The plan called for a new haul out area for floatplanes, a public-use helipad, a building for managing rescue and firefighting operations based at the airport, and other general improvements.

Airlines and destinations

There are also numerous sightseeing and fly-in fishing and hunting operations.

Statistics

Notable incidents

In November 1987, a Beechcraft 1900C operated by Ryan Air Services flight 103 (a local operator) with 22 passengers and crew, crashed while arriving from Kodiak, killing 18 and injuring four due to overloading and a center of gravity too aft of specifications.

In March 2006, agents from the US Marshal service, in conjunction with local police, attempted to apprehend a violent methamphetamine dealer, Jason Karlo Anderson, who had fled from charges in Minnesota. The suspect had rented a car at the Homer airport, and the rental agent assisted police in luring him back to the airport. Marshals were unaware that the entire Homer High School choir, over 100 students, would be departing for a trip at the same time as the setup. The suspect apparently panicked when he arrived and discovered so many people at the small airport, and a shootout ensued in the parking lot after marshals boxed in his car. Karlo committed suicide, but not before severely wounding his own infant son with a gunshot to the head. The infant's mother, Cheryl Dietzmann, contested the finding that Anderson shot his own son and in February 2009 filed against the U.S. Marshals asking for $75 million in damages. In July 2011 the Marshals settled with Dietzman for $3.5 million. An additional case against the individual Homer Police officers and the city of Homer was concluded in March 2013, with a verdict that the officers did not in fact injure the children and may have actually saved their lives by shooting Anderson.

A Cessna 206 crashed in Beluga Lake in Homer on landing, on July 10, 2012. Former Alaska state Rep. Cheryll Heinze died as a result of the crash. Four others were wounded.

In October 2013, a Beechcraft 1900C operated by Era Aviation experienced a landing gear failure and slid to a stop on its belly. No injuries were reported.

The suspect arrested for murder in connection with the Disappearance of Anesha Murnane allegedly threw her cellphone into Beluga Lake.

References

External links
 FAA Alaska airport diagram (GIF)
 

Airports in Kenai Peninsula Borough, Alaska